Ziad El-Sissy (born December 15, 1994) is an Egyptian fencer. He won the gold medal in the men's individual sabre event at the 2022 Mediterranean Games held in Oran, Algeria. He represented Egypt at the 2020 Summer Olympics in Tokyo, Japan.

Career

Ziad El-Sissy was born in Alexandria, Egypt to parents Aly and Manal El-Sissy. His father was a member of the Egypt men's national basketball team. He attended college at Wayne State University and ended his overall collegiate career with a 332–63 record, the most wins in program history.

He competed at the 2020 Summer Olympics in Tokyo. El-Sissy got 14th place in Individual Men's Sabre and Egypt got 6th in Team Men's Sabre

References

External links
 Wayne State Warriors bio

1994 births
Living people
Egyptian male sabre fencers
Fencers at the 2020 Summer Olympics
Wayne State Warriors fencers
Olympic fencers of Egypt
Sportspeople from Alexandria
20th-century Egyptian people
21st-century Egyptian people
Fencers at the 2010 Summer Youth Olympics
African Games bronze medalists for Egypt
African Games medalists in fencing
Competitors at the 2015 African Games
Mediterranean Games gold medalists for Egypt
Mediterranean Games medalists in fencing
Competitors at the 2022 Mediterranean Games